Nadi or NADI may refer to:

People
Aldo Nadi, Italian fencer
Alireza Nadi, Iranian volleyball player
Jules Nadi, French politician 
Nedo Nadi, Italian fencer
Yunus Nadi Abalıoğlu, Turkish journalist

Places
Nadi, Fiji
Nadi International Airport

Acronyms
National Association of Display Industries
Normenausschuß der deutschen Industrie (NADI), Standardisation Committee of German Industry, predecessor of Deutsches Institut für Normung (DIN)

Other uses
Nadi Bhd, Malaysian public company

Nadi (yoga), subtle energy channels described in yoga and Tantra
Nadi astrology, an Indian form of astrology
Ñadi a soil type or phytogeographic zone in Chile
Nadī, Vedic Sanskrit for "river", see Rigvedic rivers

See also
Naddi, a village in India
Nadhi, a 1969 Malayalam film
Nady (disambiguation)

Arabic-language surnames
Italian-language surnames
Turkish-language surnames